Legs on the Wall is an Australian physical theatre company based in Sydney. Formed in 1984, Legs on the Wall's performances combine acrobatics with dance, circus skills and technology. It creates aerial outdoor shows and theatre productions, performing within Australia and internationally.

Artistic intentions
Legs on the Wall's initial motives were to take the interconnections between story/theatre and circus that were emerging in Australia at the time, and further develop them, by forming a strong relationship between physical performance and Australian cultural identity.

History
The company began with two female and two male performers, who wished to uphold the concept of gender equality within their group. The company embraces a "collective process" of collaboration amongst the performers. In the early days, performances were geared towards political activism. One such show, Bruce cuts off his hand addressed workplace accidents, and premiered in Newcastle, an industrial area.

Recognition
Legs on the Wall received the 1994 Sidney Myer Performing Arts Award for a group. Its production On the Case was named Best Visual or Physical Theatre Production at the 2006 Helpmann Awards.

Noted performances
They performed at the 2000 Summer Olympics in Sydney and the 2008 Summer Olympics in Beijing. They also performed at the London 2012 Cultural Olympiad, an artistic format associated with the London Olympics.

References 

Theatre companies in Australia
Physical theatre
Theatre in Sydney